Prostaglandin F2 receptor negative regulator is a protein that in humans is encoded by the PTGFRN gene. PTGFRN has also been designated as CD315 (cluster of differentiation 315).

Interactions
PTGFRN has been shown to interact with CD9 and CD81.

References

Further reading

External links
 

Clusters of differentiation